"Welcome to the Boomtown" is the Los Angeles themed debut hit single by David & David from the album Boomtown.

The single reached #37 on the Billboard Hot 100 in 1986, #8 on the Billboard Top Rock Tracks chart. and peaked at number 27 in Australia.

References

1986 debut singles
1986 songs
American rock songs
A&M Records singles
David & David songs
Songs written by David Ricketts
Songs written by David Baerwald